The 1900 West Virginia gubernatorial election took place on November 6, 1900, to elect the governor of West Virginia.

Results

References

1900
gubernatorial
West Virginia
November 1900 events